The Martyr of Bougival (French: Le martyr de Bougival) is a 1949 French comedy crime film directed by Jean Loubignac and starring Jeanne Fusier-Gir, Bach and Line Dariel. The film's sets were designed by the art director Raymond Druart.

Plot
A prompter at the Folies Bergère comes under suspicion of murder when a female dancer's body is found in his trunk.

Cast
 Jeanne Fusier-Gir as Maître Brigitte 
 Simone Michels as Irma 
 Line Dariel as Victorine 
 Simone Paris as Arlette 
 Maguy Horiot as La bonne 
 Bach as Jules 
 Roland Armontel as Le juge d'instruction 
 Alexandre Rignault as L'inspecteur Foucher 
 René Lacourt as Modeste 
 Jacques Berlioz as Brachard 
 Paul Raysse as Lippman 
 Raphaël Patorni as Mareuil 
 Nicolas Amato as Le brigadier 
 Gérard Saint-Val as Un inspecteur

References

Bibliography 
 Rège, Philippe. Encyclopedia of French Film Directors, Volume 1. Scarecrow Press, 2009.

External links 
 

1949 films
1949 comedy-drama films
French comedy-drama films
1940s French-language films
Films directed by Jean Loubignac
Films set in Paris
French black-and-white films
1940s French films